The 2013 Apia International Sydney was a joint ATP and WTA tennis tournament, that was played on outdoor hard courts. It was the 121st edition of the Apia International Sydney, and was part of the ATP World Tour 250 series of the 2013 ATP World Tour, and of the WTA Premier tournaments of the 2013 WTA Tour. Both the men's and the women's events took place at the NSW Tennis Centre in Sydney, Australia, from 6 January to 12 January 2013.

Points and prize money

Point distribution

Prize money

* per team

ATP singles main-draw entrants

Seeds

1 Rankings as of December 31, 2012.

Other entrants
The following players received wildcards into the singles main draw:
  James Duckworth
  Matthew Ebden
  John Millman

The following players received entry from the qualifying draw:
  Guillermo García López
  Ryan Harrison
  Björn Phau
  João Sousa

The following player received entry as lucky loser:
  Ivo Klec

Withdrawals
Before the tournament
  Richard Gasquet (personal reasons)
  Gilles Simon (neck injury)
  Jo-Wilfried Tsonga (left hamstring injury)

Retirements
  Roberto Bautista Agut (lower abdominal pain)
  Radek Štěpánek (intercostal muscle strain)

ATP doubles main-draw entrants

Seeds

1 Rankings as of December 31, 2012.

Other entrants
The following pairs received wildcards into the doubles main draw:
  James Duckworth /  Chris Guccione
  Matthew Ebden /  Marinko Matosevic

Retirements
During the tournament
  Radek Štěpánek (intercostal muscle strain)

WTA singles main-draw entrants

Seeds

1 Rankings as of December 31, 2012.

Other entrants
The following players received wildcards into the singles main draw:
  Casey Dellacqua
  Olivia Rogowska

The following players received entry from the qualifying draw:
  Kimiko Date-Krumm
  Madison Keys
  Svetlana Kuznetsova
  Ayumi Morita
  Karolína Plíšková
  Galina Voskoboeva

WTA doubles main-draw entrants

Seeds

1 Rankings as of December 31, 2012.

Other entrants
The following pairs received wildcards into the doubles main draw:
  Abbie Myers /  Storm Sanders

Finals

Men's singles

  Bernard Tomic defeated  Kevin Anderson, 6–3, 6–7(2–7), 6–3.
It was Bernard Tomic's first ATP Tour Title.

Women's singles

  Agnieszka Radwańska defeated  Dominika Cibulková, 6–0, 6–0
 It was the 2nd title of the year for Radwańska, 12th overall.

Men's doubles

  Bob Bryan /  Mike Bryan defeated  Max Mirnyi /  Horia Tecău, 6–4, 6–4

Women's doubles

  Nadia Petrova /  Katarina Srebotnik defeated  Sara Errani /  Roberta Vinci, 6–3, 6–4

References

External links
Official website

 
Apia International Sydney, 2013